Welcome to the Absurd Circus is the ninth album by Italian power metal band Labyrinth, released on 22 January 2021 via Frontiers Records. It is their first album with drummer Mattia Peruzzi.

It was announced in October 2020. On 3 November 2020, the video for "The Absurd Circus" was released. On 1 December 2020, "Live Today" was streamed. On the day of the album's release, "Sleepwalker" was streamed.

Critical reception 

Writing for Metal Hammer Italia, Gianfranco Monese said that the album, as the title suggests, is "a work where the band's trademark is mixed with extravagance, where the songs contain colorful solutions in order to play and sing the illogic of delicate times like these that have in the Coronavirus the icing on the cake". He also thought the album is more guitar-oriented than its predecessor, albeit "in step with the times".

Track listing

Personnel 
Source:

 Roberto Tiranti — vocals
 Andrea Cantarelli — guitars
 Olaf Thörsen — guitars
 Nik Mazzucconi — bass
 Oleg Smirnoff — keyboards
 Mattia Peruzzi — drums

References 

2021 albums
Labyrinth (band) albums
Frontiers Records albums